Tuomas Seppälä is a Finnish guitarist, keyboardist, and composer, best known as a founding member and main composer of the Finnish symphonic power metal band Amberian Dawn.

Biography 
Seppälä started playing piano at the age of five, and in his teen years he got interested in 1980s rock, pop and heavy metal, including Ritchie Blackmore, Ronnie James Dio, Yngwie Malmsteen and ABBA. Seppälä joined the band Virtuocity as a keyboardist in the early 2000s (decade), and when the band disbanded in 2005 he formed a new band called Atheme One with Tommi Kuri and Peter James Goodman, led by his songwriting skills. In 2006, he and Tommi Kuri decided that they wanted to transform the band to include female vocals, but the same compositional style, and found the classical soprano Heidi Parviainen, with whom they formed what would be Amberian Dawn.

Seppälä graduated at Helsinki University of Technology in 2000.

Discography

With Amberian Dawn 
 Amberian Dawn (2006)
 River of Tuoni (2008)
 The Clouds of Northland Thunder (2009)
 End of Eden (2010)
 Circus Black (2012)
 Re-Evolution (2013)
 Magic Forest (2014)
 Innuendo (2015)
 Darkness of Eternity (2017)
 Looking For You (2020)

With Conquest 
The Harvest 2012

With Virtuocity 
 Northern Twilight Symphony (2004)

References

External links
Amberian Dawn Official Website

Living people
Finnish guitarists
Finnish male guitarists
Amberian Dawn members
Year of birth missing (living people)